Highvale may refer to:

Highvale, Queensland, a locality in Australia
Highvale, Alberta, a locality in Canada